FAAN Awards is an award ceremony for Nepali movies organised by Film Artistes Association of Nepal (FAAN).

References 

Nepali film awards
Annual events in Nepal